László Sepsi (born 7 June 1987) is a Romanian former professional footballer who played as a left back.

Club career

Early career
Born in Luduș of Hungarian descent, Sepsi made his professional debut with CS Gaz Metan Mediaș, making 24 Liga I appearances and scoring one goal. In 2005 he moved abroad, signing for Stade Rennais F.C. and being brought to the French club by compatriot László Bölöni, the team's manager.

Sepsi did not feature in any Ligue 1 matches in the 2005–06 season, only being fielded in a couple of games for the Coupe de France. Following the departure of Bölöni in the summer of 2006, he returned to Romania, joining ACF Gloria 1922 Bistrița where he impressed overall, helping them to a final sixth position in the top division and qualification to the UEFA Intertoto Cup; he was also team captain.

Benfica
On 12 January 2008, Sepsi signed a five-and-a-half-year contract with S.L. Benfica from the Portuguese Primeira Liga for an undisclosed fee (newspapers reported that it could have been something between €1.8 and 2.5 million). In August, he was loaned to La Liga club Racing de Santander in a season-long move. He made his competitive debut with the latter on 31 August 2008, in a 1–1 home match against Sevilla FC, and contributed with 19 games – 14 starts – as the Cantabrians finished in 12th position, thus retaining their division status.

Deemed surplus to requirements by new Benfica boss Jorge Jesus, Sepsi was again loaned to Racing Santander for 2009–10. He appeared very rarely in his second spell, however.

Politehnica Timișoara
On 4 January 2010, Sepsi joined FC Politehnica Timișoara for a fee believed to be €1.2 million on a five-year deal. The club's president, Marian Iancu, revealed that the whole deal was worth €2.3 million, which included both the transfer fee value and the player's wages.

Sepsi made his debut against former team Gloria Bistrița, in a 0–0 away draw on 20 January 2010.

Târgu Mureș / CFR Cluj
In January 2012, Sepsi was declared a free agent by the Court of Arbitration for Sport. The following month, he signed for fellow league side FCM Târgu Mureș.

In May 2012, after his contract expired, Sepsi moved to CFR Cluj for three seasons. In the 2014 winter transfer window he returned to Târgu Mureș, with the club now renamed ASA.

FC Nürnberg
In the summer of 2015, after extensive negotiations, Sepsi signed with 1. FC Nürnberg from Germany. He played 26 2. Bundesliga matches in his first season, also starting in both legs of the promotion/relegation play-offs that were lost 2–1 on aggregate to Eintracht Frankfurt.

In the 2016–17 campaign, Sepsi was sidelined for several weeks with an ankle injury. In June 2018, the club decided not to renew his expiring contract.

Universitatea Cluj
On 28 August 2018, aged 31, Sepsi returned to his homeland and joined FC Universitatea Cluj.

International career
László Sepsi made his full debut for Romania on 26 March 2008 when coach Victor Pițurcă sent him on the field in the 87th minute of a 3–0 victory in a friendly against Russia played on the Ghencea stadium from Bucharest. His following two games were also friendlies, a 2–0 loss against Israel and a 3–0 victory against Honduras. Sepsi's last game for the national team was a 0–0 against Northern Ireland at the Euro 2016 qualifiers.

Career statistics

Club

References

External links

1987 births
Living people
People from Luduș
Romanian sportspeople of Hungarian descent
Romanian footballers
Association football defenders
Liga I players
Liga II players
CS Gaz Metan Mediaș players
ACF Gloria Bistrița players
FC Politehnica Timișoara players
ASA 2013 Târgu Mureș players
CFR Cluj players
FC Universitatea Cluj players
Stade Rennais F.C. players
Primeira Liga players
S.L. Benfica footballers
La Liga players
Racing de Santander players
2. Bundesliga players
1. FC Nürnberg players
Romania under-21 international footballers
Romania international footballers
Romanian expatriate footballers
Expatriate footballers in France
Expatriate footballers in Portugal
Expatriate footballers in Spain
Expatriate footballers in Germany
Romanian expatriate sportspeople in France
Romanian expatriate sportspeople in Portugal
Romanian expatriate sportspeople in Spain
Romanian expatriate sportspeople in Germany